The 2022–23 network television schedule for the five major English-language commercial broadcast networks in the United States covers the prime time hours from September 2022 to August 2023. The schedule is followed by a list per network of returning series, new series, and series canceled after the 2021–22 television season.

NBC was the first to announce its fall schedule on May 16, 2022, via press release, followed by an upfront presentation to advertisers at 11 a.m. Eastern Time. ABC announced its fall schedule on May 17 (with an upfront presentation at 4 p.m. that day), followed by CBS on May 18 (with their upfront presentation at 4 p.m. that day), and The CW on May 19 (with their upfront presentation at 11 a.m. that day). Fox announced its programming on May 16 shortly after NBC (with their upfront presentation at 4 p.m. that day), but released its prime-time schedule (along with their premiere dates) on June 6.

PBS is not included, as member television stations have local flexibility over most of their schedules and broadcast times for network shows may vary. Ion Television and MyNetworkTV are also not included since both networks' schedules only feature syndicated reruns.

Legend

Schedule

 New series are highlighted in bold.
 All times are U.S. Eastern and Pacific Time (except for some live sports or events). Subtract one hour for Central, Mountain, Alaska, and Hawaii-Aleutian times.
 All sporting events air live in all time zones in U.S. Eastern time, with local and/or late night programming (including Fox affiliates during the 10 p.m. ET/PT hour) by affiliates after game completion.
 CBS's primetime programming is scheduled to be preempted on March 23–24, April 1 and 3 for the network's coverage of 2023 March Madness.

Sunday

Notes:
 CBS is scheduled to air the 2023 CMT Music Awards on April 2, 2023 at 8 p.m.
 Fox is scheduled to air the 2023 Food City Dirt Race on April 9, 2023 at 7 p.m.

Monday

Notes:
Fox is scheduled to air the 2023 iHeartRadio Music Awards on March 27, 2023 at 8 p.m.

Tuesday

Wednesday

Thursday

Note:
 ABC is scheduled to air round 1 of the 2023 NFL Draft on April 27, 2023 at 8 p.m.

Friday

Notes:
 ABC is scheduled to air a primetime NBA playoff game on April 21, 2023 at 8:30 p.m.
 ABC is scheduled to air rounds 2 and 3 of the 2023 NFL Draft on April 28, 2023 at 7 p.m.

Saturday

Notes:
 Effective until May 20, 2023, NBC stations in the Pacific, Mountain, Alaska and Hawaiian (for weeks when live sports are not airing in primetime) time zones carry new episodes of Saturday Night Live simultaneously with the rest of the United States, resulting in the program airing during prime time in these areas throughout the season (as a result, select Saturday primetime programs may be preempted or placed in different day and timeslots in these time zones); an encore broadcast is shown after late local newscasts in those time zones; however, for encore episodes it will be aired on tape delay in all time zones in its designated time slot. The network's affiliates in Hawaii (select weeks) and other Pacific island territories carry SNL on delay as usual regardless of new or encore.
 NBC is scheduled to air the 2023 World Figure Skating Championship on March 25, 2023 at 8 p.m.
 Fox is scheduled to air primetime MLS games on April 1 and 8 at 7:30 p.m.
 The CW is scheduled to air a one-hour season premiere of Totally Weird and Funny on April 8, 2023 at 9 p.m, before moving to its regular time slot on April 15.
 Fox is scheduled to air a primetime USFL game on April 15, 2023 at 7:30 p.m.
 ABC is scheduled to air primetime NBA playoff games on April 15, May 6 and 20, 2023 at 8:30 p.m.
 ABC is scheduled to air Stanley Cup playoff games on April 22, 29 and May 27 at 8 p.m.
 ABC is scheduled to air the 2023 XFL Championship Game on May 13, 2023 at 8 p.m.

By network

ABC

Returning series:
 20/20
 Abbott Elementary
 America's Funniest Home Videos
 American Idol
 The Bachelor
 Bachelor in Paradise
 Big Sky
 Celebrity Family Feud
 Celebrity Wheel of Fortune
 The Chase
 Claim to Fame
 The Conners
 The Goldbergs
 The Good Doctor
 The Great Christmas Light Fight
 Grey's Anatomy
 Home Economics
 Judge Steve Harvey
 A Million Little Things
 Monday Night Football
 NBA Saturday Primetime
 NHL on ABC
 Press Your Luck
 The Rookie
 Saturday Night Football
 Shark Tank
 Station 19
 The Wonder Years

New series:
 Alaska Daily
 Celebrity Jeopardy!
 The Company You Keep
 Not Dead Yet
 The Parent Test
 The Prank Panel
 The Rookie: Feds
 Will Trent

Not returning from 2021–22:
 Black-ish
 Dancing with the Stars (moved to Disney+)
 The Fatal Flaw: A Special Edition of 20/20
 Let the World See
 Promised Land
 Queens
 Women of the Movement

CBS

Returning series:
 48 Hours
 60 Minutes
 The Amazing Race
 Big Brother
 Blue Bloods
 Bob Hearts Abishola
 CSI: Vegas
 The Equalizer
 FBI
 FBI: International
 FBI: Most Wanted
 Ghosts
 Lingo
 NCIS
 NCIS: Hawaiʻi
 NCIS: Los Angeles
 The Neighborhood
 Survivor
 S.W.A.T.
 Tough as Nails
 Young Sheldon

New series:
 East New York
 Fire Country
 The Real Love Boat
 So Help Me Todd
 Superfan
 True Lies

Not returning from 2021–22:
 Beyond the Edge
 B Positive
 Bull
 Good Sam
 How We Roll
 Magnum P.I. (moved to NBC)
 SEAL Team (moved to Paramount+)
Superstar Racing Experience (moved to ESPN)
 United States of Al

The CW

Returning series:
 All American
 All American: Homecoming
 Coroner
 The Flash
 Kung Fu
 Masters of Illusion
 Mysteries Decoded
 Nancy Drew
 Penn & Teller: Fool Us
 Riverdale
 Stargirl
 Superman & Lois
 Walker
 Whose Line Is It Anyway?
 World's Funniest Animals

New series:
 100 Days to Indy
 Criss Angel's Magic With the Stars
 Family Law
 Gotham Knights
 The Great American Joke Off
 Professionals
 Recipe for Disaster
 Totally Weird and Funny
 Walker: Independence
 The Winchesters

Not returning from 2021–22:
 4400
 Batwoman
 Charmed
 Dynasty
 In the Dark
 Legacies
 Legends of the Hidden Temple
 Legends of Tomorrow
 March
 Naomi
 Roswell, New Mexico
 Tom Swift
 Wellington Paranormal

Fox

Returning series:
 9-1-1
 9-1-1: Lone Star
 Bob's Burgers
 Call Me Kat
 Celebrity Name That Tune
 The Cleaning Lady
 Crime Scene Kitchen
 Family Guy
 Fantasy Island
 Farmer Wants a Wife
 Fox College Football
 Fox College Hoops
 The Great North
 Hell's Kitchen
 HouseBroken
 Lego Masters
 The Masked Singer
 MasterChef
 Next Level Chef
 NFL on Fox
 The OT
 The Resident
 The Simpsons
 Welcome to Flatch
 WWE SmackDown

New series:
 Accused
 Alert: Missing Persons Unit
 Animal Control
 Gordon Ramsay's Food Stars
 Grimsburg
 Lego Masters: Celebrity Holiday Bricktacular
 Monarch
 Special Forces: World's Toughest Test

Not returning from 2021–22:
 The Big Leap
 Duncanville (moved to Hulu) 
 Our Kind of People
 Pivoting
 Thursday Night Football (moved to Prime Video)

NBC

Returning series:
 American Auto
 The Blacklist
 Capital One College Bowl
 Chicago Fire
 Chicago Med
 Chicago P.D.
 Dateline NBC
 Football Night in America
 Grand Crew
 La Brea
 Law & Order
 Law & Order: Organized Crime
 Law & Order: Special Victims Unit
 Magnum P.I. (moved from CBS)
 NBC Sunday Night Football
 New Amsterdam
 That's My Jam
 Transplant
 The Voice
 Weakest Link
 Young Rock

New series:
 America's Got Talent: All-Stars
 LA Fire and Rescue
 Lopez vs Lopez
 Night Court
 Quantum Leap
 The Wheel

Not returning from 2021–22:
 America's Got Talent: Extreme
 The Courtship (moved to USA Network)
 The Endgame
 Home Sweet Home (moved to Peacock)
 Kenan
 Mr. Mayor
 Ordinary Joe
 The Thing About Pam
 This Is Us

Renewals and cancellations

Full season pickups

ABC
 Abbott Elementary—Picked up for a 22-episode full season on July 21, 2022.
 The Conners—Picked up for a 22-episode full season on October 12, 2022.
The Rookie: Feds—Picked up for a 22-episode full season on October 21, 2022.

CBS
 East New York—Picked up for a full season on October 19, 2022.
 Fire Country—Picked up for a full season on October 19, 2022.
 So Help Me Todd—Picked up for a full season on October 19, 2022.

The CW

Fox

NBC
 Lopez vs Lopez—Picked up for a 22-episode full season on December 2, 2022.
 Quantum Leap—Picked up for six additional episodes on October 10, 2022, bringing the episode count to 18.

Renewals

ABC
 Abbott Elementary—Renewed for a third season on January 11, 2023.
 Celebrity Family Feud—Renewed for a ninth season on January 11, 2023.
 Claim to Fame—Renewed for a second season on January 11, 2023.
 The Great Christmas Light Fight—Renewed for an eleventh season on October 24, 2022.
 Monday Night Football—Renewed for a fourth season on March 18, 2021; deal will last into a thirteenth season in 2033.
 Press Your Luck—Renewed for a fifth season on January 11, 2023.

CBS
 48 Hours—Renewed for a thirty-fifth season on February 21, 2023.
 60 Minutes—Renewed for a fifty-sixth season on February 21, 2023.
 The Amazing Race—Renewed for a thirty-fifth season on February 21, 2023.
 Bob Hearts Abishola—Renewed for a fifth season on January 25, 2023.
 CSI: Vegas—Renewed for a third season on February 21, 2023.
 The Equalizer—Renewed for a fourth season on May 5, 2022.
 FBI—Renewed for a sixth season on May 9, 2022.
 FBI: International—Renewed for a third season on May 9, 2022.
 FBI: Most Wanted—Renewed for a fifth season on May 9, 2022.
 Fire Country—Renewed for a second season on January 6, 2023.
 Ghosts—Renewed for a third season on January 12, 2023.
 Lingo—Renewed for a second season on February 21, 2023.
 NCIS—Renewed for a twenty-first season on February 21, 2023.
 NCIS: Hawaiʻi—Renewed for a third season on February 21, 2023.
 The Neighborhood—Renewed for a sixth season on January 23, 2023.
 So Help Me Todd—Renewed for a second season on February 2, 2023.
 Survivor—Renewed for a forty-fifth season on February 21, 2023.
 Tough as Nails—Renewed for a fifth season on February 21, 2023.
 Young Sheldon—Renewed for a seventh season on March 30, 2021.

The CW
 All American—Renewed for a sixth season on January 11, 2023.
 Whose Line Is It Anyway?—Renewed for a twentieth and final season on November 5, 2022.

Fox
 Bob's Burgers—Renewed for a fourteenth and fifteenth season on January 26, 2023.
 The Cleaning Lady—Renewed for a third season on February 1, 2023.
 Family Guy—Renewed for a twenty-second and twenty-third season on January 26, 2023.
 The Great North—Renewed for a fourth season on August 26, 2022.
 Grimsburg—Renewed for a second season on October 17, 2022.
 Lego Masters—Renewed for a fourth season on December 14, 2022.
 The Simpsons—Renewed for a thirty-fifth and thirty-sixth season on January 26, 2023.

NBC
 Football Night in America—Renewed for an eighteenth season on March 18, 2021; deal will go to a twenty-eighth season in 2033.
 La Brea—Renewed for a third season on January 31, 2023.
 Magnum P.I.—Renewed for a sixth season on June 30, 2022.
 NBC Sunday Night Football—Renewed for an eighteenth season on March 18, 2021; deal will go to a twenty-eighth season in 2033.
 Night Court—Renewed for a second season on February 2, 2023.
 Quantum Leap—Renewed for a second season on December 12, 2022.

Cancellations/series endings

ABC
The Goldbergs—It was announced on February 23, 2023, that season ten would be the final season. The series will conclude on May 3, 2023.
A Million Little Things—It was announced on November 7, 2022, that season five would be the final season.

CBS
 NCIS: Los Angeles—It was announced on January 20, 2023, that season fourteen would be the final season. The series will conclude on May 21, 2023.
 The Real Love Boat—It was announced on October 28, 2022, that the series would move to Paramount+ beginning November 2, 2022 after its first four episodes due to poor ratings, marking the first cancellation of the season.

The CW
 The Flash—It was announced on August 1, 2022, that season nine would be the final season. The series will conclude on May 24, 2023.
 Nancy Drew—It was announced on October 26, 2022 that season four would be the final season. The series will conclude on August 23, 2023.
 Riverdale—It was announced on May 19, 2022, that season seven would be the final season. The series will conclude on August 23, 2023.
 Stargirl—It was announced on October 31, 2022, that season three would be the final season. The series concluded on December 7, 2022.
 Would I Lie to You? (UK)—The series acquisition is limited to two seasons only.

Fox
 Monarch—Canceled on December 7, 2022.

NBC
 The Blacklist—It was announced on February 1, 2023, that season ten would be the final season.
 New Amsterdam—It was announced on March 14, 2022, that season five would be the final season. The series concluded on January 17, 2023.

See also
 2022–23 Canadian network television schedule
 2022–23 United States network television schedule (morning)
 2022–23 United States network television schedule (afternoon)
 2022–23 United States network television schedule (late night)
 2022–23 United States network television schedule (overnight)

Explanatory notes

References

2022 in American television
2023 in American television
United States primetime network television schedules